St. Joe State Park is a public recreation area consisting of  on the south side of Park Hills, Missouri, along the flanks of the Saint Francois Mountains. The state park includes the Missouri Mines State Historic Site with its former St. Joe Minerals mill buildings and museum of geology and mining.

See also 
 Finger Lakes State Park: another Missouri state park on reclaimed mines

References

External links 

St. Joe State Park Missouri Department of Natural Resources 
St. Joe State Park Map Missouri Department of Natural Resources

Protected areas of St. Francois County, Missouri
State parks of Missouri
Protected areas established in 1976
1976 establishments in Missouri
Mine reclamation